Louise of Denmark and Norway (19 October 1726 – 8 August 1756) was a Danish and Norwegian princess, the daughter of King Christian VI of Denmark and his wife Sophie Magdalene of Brandenburg-Kulmbach. Following her marriage to Ernest Frederick III, Duke of Saxe-Hildburghausen, she became Duchess of Saxe-Hildburghausen.

Biography 

Louise was described by foreign diplomats as a lively person, not well suited to the rigid and religious court of her parents. The relations between her and her parents were not good because of their differing personalities. She disliked the strict customs at court; her father complained about her "rebellious nature" in a letter to his friend Count Christian Günther Stolberg. Louise's name is recorded to have played a major role in the delicate diplomatic game that was driven in Christian VI's final years.

Scandal and marriage
Initially attentions were drawn to get her married soon with George II of Great Britain's younger son, the Duke of Cumberland but this plan were abandoned following Christian VI's attempt to make her Queen of Sweden during the election of the heir to the vacant Swedish throne in 1742–43 through an engagement with the Prince of Zweibrücken-Birkenfeld who acted as France's candidate or the prince of Mecklenburg who were also considered as a suitable option. However, none of these plans came to fruition, amidst the tension between the Danish-Norwegian state and Sweden, Holstein-Gottorp's candidate Adolf Frederick got elected King in 1743 by the Swedish Riksdag, it was a serious topic that a marriage between her and Adolf Frederick would be conducive to an alliance between the two kingdoms, but it was stranded on Christian VI's unwise unwillingness to see his daughter married to a Gottorpian prince.

Under her brother Frederick V's reign in 1749, Louise had an affair—and possibly a child—with a valet de chambre from the noble Danish family Ahlefeldt, who was afterwards sentenced to imprisonment for his audacity in Munkholm Fortress in Norway. Later that year, she was hastily married to Ernest Frederick III, Duke of Saxe-Hildburghausen, with a large dowry to hasten the wedding and calm down the scandal. They married in the Hirschholm Palace, north of Copenhagen, on 1 October 1749.

Duchess of Saxe-Hildburghausen
As duchess of Saxe-Hildburghausen, she hosted a court known for its formal etiquette, great costs and many parties; she was described as proud and with "royal expenses" in her way of living, amusing herself with ballets, masquerades, balls, hunting and gambling, driving through the streets with a carriage (or, in winters, with a sleigh) of gold and silver.

In December 1755 she gave birth to a daughter, who died after a month: Princess Frederica Sophie Juliane Caroline (5 December 1755 – 10 January 1756). 

Louise died on 8 August 1756.

Ancestry

References

Heinrich Ferdinand Schoeppl: Die Herzoge von Sachsen-Altenburg. Bozen 1917, Neudruck Altenburg 1992
Rudolf Armin Human: Chronik der Stadt Hildburghausen Hildburghausen 1886

1756 deaths
1726 births
Danish princesses
Norwegian princesses
House of Oldenburg in Denmark
House of Saxe-Hildburghausen
Duchesses of Saxe-Hildburghausen
Deaths_in_childbirth
Daughters of kings